Bosondjo Airport  was an airstrip serving Bosondjo, a town in Mongala Province, Democratic Republic of the Congo.

Aerial imagery show trees and shrubbery growing on the former runway.

See also

Transport in the Democratic Republic of the Congo
List of airports in the Democratic Republic of the Congo

References

External links
OpenStreetMap - Bosondjo Airport

Defunct airports
Airports in Mongala